Sultan Abu Syahid Shah ibni Almarhum Sultan Muhammad Shah (died 1446) whose real name was Raja Ibrahim, was the 4th Sultan of the Malaccan Sultanate from 1444 to 1446. Despite the fact that Malacca was a Muslim kingdom, Syahid Shah was a practising Hindu. He styled himself as Raja Sri Parameswara Deva Shah. Appointment of Raja Ibrahim as 4th Sultan of Malacca was unpopular because he was too young and raw. His predecessor, Sultan Muhammad Shah had alleged saw the Islamic prophet Muhammad in his dream and converted to Islam. Syahid Shah on taking a Hindu title represented a traditionalist reaction in Malacca against Islam, the new religion. He reigned for only seventeen months, after which he was murdered in a plot allegedly conspired by the Tamil Muslim Bendahara (Grand Vizier), (Datuk Seri Nara Diraja Tun Ali), Raja Kassim, son of Muhammad Shah, Tun Perpatih Sedang and Datuk Bendahara Seri Amar Diraja. Syahid Shah was then given the title Abu Syahid, which means "the Martyred King".

References

1. Modul Latihan Pengajaran dan Pembelajaran Sejarah, Pusat Perkembangan Kurikulum Kementerian Pendidikan Malaysia.

2. Malaysia Kita, International Law Book Services, Kuala Lumpur, 2005

1446 deaths
Sultans of Malacca
Hindu martyrs
Malaysian Hindus
Hindu monarchs
Child monarchs from Asia
Monarchs who died as children
15th-century murdered monarchs
15th-century monarchs in Asia